A mine train roller coaster is a steel roller coaster whose trains often depict a set of mine carts, with the forward-most car or portions of it sometimes resembling a small steam locomotive. Most mine train roller coasters are themed in the style of a mine, a Western scene, or simply a mountain range.

Traditional mine train roller coaster track elements include several banked turns and helices. There are sometimes level straightaway sections, but few large drops. Most include more than one lift hill. Often, a mine train roller coaster will make its way through trees, tunnels, rock formations, and over small bodies of water. Some feature scenes with animatronic figures.

The first mine train roller coaster of its kind was Runaway Mine Train (Run-A-Way Mine Train until 1995) at Six Flags Over Texas. Built by Arrow Development in 1966, Mine Train is the oldest roller coaster in the park. With Matterhorn Bobsleds at Disneyland (built in 1959 also by Arrow), it is one of the first roller coasters with tubular steel tracks.

Other notable Mine Trains are Colorado Adventure in Phantasialand, the Big Thunder Mountains in various Disney parks, Thunder Run in Canada's Wonderland, Cedar Creek Mine Ride at Cedar Point, and Thunderation in Silver Dollar City near Branson, Missouri.

External links

 Intamin official website
 Vekoma official website

 
Types of roller coaster